Elatos, before 1927 known as Dobrani (Δόβρανη) is a village and a community of the Grevena municipality. Before the 2011 local government reform it was a part of the municipality of Grevena, of which it was a municipal district. The 2011 census recorded 215 residents in the village and 369 residents in the community. The community of Elatos covers an area of 23.305 km2.

Administrative division
The community of Elatos consists of two separate settlements: 
Elatos (population 164)
Kastro (population 13)
The aforementioned population figures are as of 2011.

Population
According to the 2011 census, the population of the settlement of Elatos was 164 people, a decrease of almost 24% compared to the previous census of 2001.

See also
 List of settlements in the Grevena regional unit

References

Populated places in Grevena (regional unit)
Villages in Greece